Sufyan Mehmood (born 21 October 1991) is an Omani cricketer, who plays for the Oman national cricket team. He played in the 2014 ICC World Cricket League Division Four tournament. He made his Twenty20 International debut for Oman against Hong Kong on 26 November 2015. He made his List A debut for Oman in their three-match series against the United Arab Emirates in October 2016.

In August 2018, he was named in Oman's squad for the 2018 Asia Cup Qualifier tournament. In October 2018, he was named in Oman's squad for the 2018 ICC World Cricket League Division Three tournament. In March 2019, he was named in Oman's team for the 2019 ICC World Cricket League Division Two tournament in Namibia. In September 2019, he was named in Oman's squad for the 2019 ICC T20 World Cup Qualifier tournament.

In September 2021, he was named in Oman's One Day International (ODI) squad for round six and round seven of the 2019–2023 ICC Cricket World Cup League 2. He made his ODI debut on 19 September 2021, for Oman against Nepal. He was also named in Oman's squad for the 2021 ICC Men's T20 World Cup.

References

External links
 

1991 births
Living people
People from Muscat, Oman
Omani cricketers
Oman One Day International cricketers
Oman Twenty20 International cricketers